Lionel Tivoli (born 29 February 1988) is a French businessman and politician who has represented the 2nd constituency of the Alpes-Maritimes department in the National Assembly since 2022. He is a member of the National Rally (RN).

Biography
Tivoli was born in Marseille. He worked as a recruitment consultant and hiring manager in the IT sector before founding a business manufacturing and selling e-liquids for electronic cigarettes in 2013. He first joined the National Rally, then called the National Front, in 2006; he was a delegate of the National Youth Front (now Génération Nation) in Alpes-Maritimes.

Tivoli served as a municipal councillor of Antibes from 2014 to 2020, when he became a municipal councillor of Vallauris.

In 2015, he was elected to the Regional Council of Provence-Alpes-Côte d'Azur for Alpes-Maritimes. The same year, he became party departmental secretary.

Ahead of the 2022 legislative election, Tivoli was selected to contest the 2nd constituency of Alpes-Maritimes. He subsequently took the seat from Loïc Dombreval of La République En Marche! after winning it in the second round.

References 

Living people
1988 births
Politicians from Marseille
People from Alpes-Maritimes 
National Rally (France) politicians
French city councillors
Members of the Regional Council of Provence-Alpes-Côte d'Azur
Deputies of the 16th National Assembly of the French Fifth Republic